Phoutpasong Sengdalavong is a former Laotian footballer who played as a goalkeeper. He is currently coaching Viengchanh FC.

References 

Living people
1983 births
Laotian footballers
Laos international footballers
Association football goalkeepers